Stifford is an area and former civil parish in the unitary authority of Thurrock, Essex, England. The traditional parish of Stifford is divided by the A13 trunk road into two communities known respectively as North and South Stifford. In 1931 the parish had a population of 2188. On 1 April 1936 the parish was abolished to form Thurrock.

Origin of name
The place name Stifford is first recorded in Domesday as Stiforda and means "path ford". The ford was across the Mardyke which flows through North Stifford before joining the Thames at Purfleet. Stifford gives its name to the Stifford Clays housing estate built in the late 1950s.

North Stifford
The original parish church (St Mary the Virgin) is located within North Stifford. The church is originally 12th century with later 13th, 14th and 19th century alterations and extensions, and is a Grade I listed building. The church contains several interesting medieval monumental brasses. William Palin who was rector between 1834 and 1882 wrote the earliest local histories devoted solely to the Thurrock area - Stifford and its Neighbourhood (1871) and More about Stifford and its Neighbourhood (1872). Palin was followed in 1980 by The Stifford Saga by Doreen Dean and Pamela Studd and in 2012 The Idyll in the Middyl by Cliff and Jan Cowin. The North Stifford Village sign was unveiled on 1 July 2011

South Stifford
South Stifford is a small residential area within the town of Grays. South Stifford separates Grays' town centre from West Thurrock and Lakeside Shopping Centre. It acts as a residential area for people working in many of the towns factories and surrounding retail areas, however it has recently been overshadowed by the huge housing estate of Chafford Hundred.

Education
South Stifford has one primary school, Stifford Primary School.

References

Former civil parishes in Essex
Thurrock